Adeodato Giovanni Piazza, O.C.D. (30 September 1884 – 30 November 1957) was an Italian friar of the Discalced Carmelite Order, who became a cardinal of the Roman Catholic Church, and Patriarch of Venice, as well as a member of the Roman Curia in Vatican City.

Life
He was born in Vigo di Cadore, a small village in  the mountains of the Veneto region of Italy, the son of Giuseppe Piazza and Elisabetta Nicolò. In 1897 he began to study at a school run by the friars, being admitted to the Order on 6 August 1902. He professed his religious vows on 7 August 1903, after which he was drafted to fulfill his military obligations by serving in the medical corps in Treviso from 1904 to 1906. He returned to the Carmelite monastery and was sent to complete his seminary studies, professing his solemn vows on 7 August 1907. He was ordained a Catholic priest on 19 December 1908 by the Patriarch of Venice. He then served as the prior in several monasteries of the Order, until the outbreak of World War I, at which time he served as a military chaplain.

After the war Piazza was again sent to serve as the prior of several local monasteries over the subsequent years. In 1922 he was called to Rome to serve as the Secretary to the Prior General of the Order, serving in that position until 1925, when he was elected as the Procurator General of the Order. On 29 January 1930, Piazza was appointed as the Archbishop of Benevento, for which office he was consecrated as a bishop the following 24 February in the Discalced Carmelite Church of Santa Teresa, Rome.

Piazza was appointed as Patriarch of Venice in December 1935 and formally installed early the next year. He was elevated to cardinal by Pope Pius XI in the consistory of 13 December 1937, with the title of Cardinal Priest of Santa Prisca. As cardinal, Piazza participated in the Papal conclave of 1939 that elected Pope Pius XII.

Piazza remained Patriarch of Venice until 1948 at which time he was named by Pope Pius XII as the Secretary of the Sacred Consistorial Congregation (now called the Congregation for Bishops). He remained in this capacity until his death. In 1949 his title was changed by the pope to Cardinal Bishop of Sabina e Poggio Mirteto. On 11 June 1951 he consecrated the Venerable Fulton John Sheen a bishop at the Roman basilica of Sts. John and Paul.

Piazza died in Rome on 30 November 1957, and was buried in the Church of Santa Teresa.

Episcopal lineage
Piazza's episcopal lineage, or apostolic succession was:

 Cardinal Scipione Rebiba
 Cardinal Giulio Antonio Santorio
 Cardinal Girolamo Bernerio
 Archbishop Galeazzo Sanvitale
 Cardinal Ludovico Ludovisi
 Cardinal Luigi Caetani
 Cardinal Ulderico Carpegna
 Cardinal Paluzzo Paluzzi Altieri degli Albertoni
 Pope Benedict XIII
 Pope Benedict XIV
 Cardinal Enrico Enríquez
 Archbishop Manuel Quintano Bonifaz
 Cardinal Buenaventura Fernández de Córdoba Spínola
 Cardinal Giuseppe Doria Pamphili
 Pope Pius VIII
 Pope Pius IX
 Cardinal Alessandro Franchi
 Cardinal Giovanni Simeoni
 Cardinal Antonio Agliardi
 Cardinal Basilio Pompili
 Cardinal Adeodato Giovanni Piazza

References

Sources
Catholic Hierarchy
Cardinals of the Holy Roman Church

1884 births
1957 deaths
People from the Province of Belluno
Discalced Carmelites
Italian military chaplains
World War I chaplains
Discalced Carmelite bishops
20th-century Italian Roman Catholic archbishops
Archbishops of Benevento
20th-century Italian cardinals
Carmelite cardinals
Cardinal-bishops of Sabina
Patriarchs of Venice
Members of the Sacred Consistorial Congregation
Grand Crosses 1st class of the Order of Merit of the Federal Republic of Germany